Homo is the taxonomical genus that includes modern humans (Homo sapiens sapiens).

Homo may also refer to:

Latin and Greek terms
 Homo, Latin for "man", "human being", see Human
Homo sapiens
 Homo-, Greek prefix expressing the notion of "same, identical"
 Homo, an abbreviation for homogenized milk
 Homo-, in chemistry, a prefix indicating a homolog, an organic analog of next higher straight chain/ring size at some part of molecule
 Homo (slang), an abbreviation for "homosexual"

People with the name
 Amandine Homo (born 1980), former French athlete

Arts, entertainment, and media
 HOMO (journal), a bimonthly peer-reviewed scientific journal on human biology
 Homo, wolfhound in Victor Hugo's novel The Man Who Laughs

Other uses
 HOMO, in chemistry, highest occupied molecular orbital
 HomO, the Swedish Ombudsman against Discrimination on Grounds of Sexual Orientation

See also

Ecce Homo (disambiguation)
 Homos, an alternate spelling of hummus, a food dip or spread
Names for the human species